Philippe Chartrand (born 23 December 1963) is a Canadian gymnast. He competed at the 1984 Summer Olympics and the 1988 Summer Olympics.

References

1963 births
Living people
Canadian male artistic gymnasts
Olympic gymnasts of Canada
Gymnasts at the 1984 Summer Olympics
Gymnasts at the 1988 Summer Olympics
Sportspeople from Laval, Quebec